Pernille Sørensen (born 20 February 1998) is a Danish figure skater. She is the 2014 Denkova-Staviski Cup champion, and a two-time Danish national champion (2015, 2018). She has competed in the final segment at two European Championships (2018, 2019) and the 2014 World Junior Championships.

Personal life
Pernille Sørensen was born on 20 February 1998 in Esbjerg, Denmark. She is the daughter of Gitte and Peter Sørensen and has a brother, Nicki, who is five years younger.

Career
Sørensen began skating in 2001. In 2010, she relocated with her family from Esbjerg to Odense, following three years of commuting to Odense for her training. Coached by Pernille Gormsen, she debuted on the ISU Junior Grand Prix series in 2011.

2012–2013 season 
Sørensen was coached in Odense by Andrzej Strzelec before switching to Alexei Fedoseev. She was assigned to the 2013 World Junior Championships in Milan, Italy but did not reach the free skate.

2013–2014 season 
Sørensen continued to train under Alexei Fedoseev in Odense. At the 2014 World Junior Championships in Sofia, Bulgaria, she qualified for the free skate and finished 18th overall.

2014–2015 season 
Sørensen made her senior international debut, at the 2014 International Cup of Nice, and became the Danish senior national champion for the first time. As of January 2015, she is coached by Kalle Strid and Martin Johansson in Copenhagen. She did not reach the final at the 2015 European Championships in Stockholm, Sweden, placing 27th in the short program. Sørensen placed 4th at the 2015 Nordic Championships in Stavanger, Norway. At the 2015 World Junior Championships she did not advance to the final.

2015–2016 season 
Sørensen reached her personal best score at the 2015 NRW Trophy, placing 4th. She was eliminated after the short program at the 2016 European Championships in Bratislava, Slovakia. On 12 February 2016, the Danish Skating Union announced that she had decided to stop her career.

2017–2018 season 
Sørensen returned to international competition in September 2017 at the Slovenia Open.

Programs

Competitive highlights 
CS: Challenger Series; JGP: Junior Grand Prix

References

External links 
 

1998 births
Danish female single skaters
Living people
People from Esbjerg
Sportspeople from the Region of Southern Denmark